Matrena Stepanovna Nogovitsyna (born November 6, 1991) is a Russian player in the International draughts who currently holds women's world champion title. has been a champion player of Russia since 2004. Matrena Nogovitsyna is a Women's International grandmaster (GMIF). She is trained by Alexander Georgiev.

Matrena Nogovitsyna started to play draughts from eight years old. She emerged as runners-up at the 2011 Women's World Draughts Championship and was placed third at the 2010 Women's Draughts Championship. She is a two time women's draughts champion in blitz and three time women's draughts champion in rapid. She too was ranked as first at Women's European Draughts Championship (2018) and on 3 occasions third (2004, 2008 and 2016).

In 2021 she won a gold medal at Women's World Draughts Championship. It is her first world champion title.

Participation in World and European Championships

References

External links
World Championship Women 1973 - 2011
Pfofile, FMJD
Pfofile, KNDB

1991 births
Living people
Russian draughts players
Players of international draughts
Sportspeople from Sakha